The 1998-1999 Kosovo Verification Mission (KVM) was an OSCE mission to verify that the Serbian and Yugoslav forces were complying with the UN October Agreement to end atrocities in Kosovo, withdraw armed forces from Kosovo, and abide by a ceasefire.

Remit
The KVM's job was to monitor parties' compliance with the agreement, to report any breaches to the OSCE, and to help affected civilians in Kosovo. Other requirements included:
 To report on roadblocks;
 To oversee elections;
 To ensure that independent and fair police service was set up.

Operations

United States diplomat William Walker was appointed head of the mission; he was relatively senior, reflecting the importance that NATO put on a peaceful settlement. His deputy was Gabriel Keller.

Despite being much larger and more complex than any previous OSCE mission, the KVM was put together relatively quickly; parts of the team arrived in Kosovo a month after the 16 October agreement. The KVM was divided into five regions, with a headquarters in Pristina.

Immediately after the Agreement, neither side adhered to the ceasefire; state loyalist forces continued to shoot at civilians, and there were sporadic KLA attacks on state forces.

When a KVM team arrived at the scene of the Račak massacre, they found "36 bodies 23 of which were lying in a ditch". An independent Finnish forensic investigation established that the bodies had evidence of ballistic gunshot trauma from a distance and traces of gunpowder residue on their hands, suggesting that they were killed as a result of a skirmish with Yugoslav police force.

Operation Eagle Eye

Operation Eagle Eye was part of the Kosovo Verification Mission during the Kosovo War using aircraft were contributed by France, Germany, Italy, Netherlands, the UK, and the USA. Beginning on 17 October 1998. The aim was to monitor the federal Yugoslav government's compliance with United Nations Security Council Resolution 1199, and in particular the withdrawal of armed forces from Kosovo and compliance with the ceasefire.

The monitors comprised 1,400 ground observers. As a result of Yugoslav troop activities and other forms of non-compliance, the ground observers withdrew citing "an unacceptable level of risk to the peace support verification mission", resulting in an end to aerial verification on March 24, 1999.

Withdrawal
In March 1999, together with the Rambouillet Agreement which the Serbian government refused to sign, there was an increase in ceasefire violations by both sides; as the risks increased, it was decided to withdraw the KVM to Ohrid in Macedonia. Yugoslav forces' reaction to the withdrawal was "remarkably docile" and the KVM was downsized to 250 staff.

Then, after the KVM had left, state forces began a campaign of killings, rapes, detentions, and deportations of the Kosovar Albanian population.

Refugees fled to Albania, Macedonia, and Montenegro; many refugees had their documents destroyed.

As a result, on 24 March NATO started its bombing campaign in what remained of Yugoslavia.

In April 1999, the OSCE decided that the KVM should help deal with the refugee chaos; 70 verifiers were sent to Tirana, where they helped coordinate disaster-response and interviewed refugees.

References

Kosovo War
Organization for Security and Co-operation in Europe
Serbian war crimes in the Kosovo War